The BBC campus, Broadcasting House Bristol, is located on Whiteladies Road, Bristol. The first building to be occupied was 21/23 Whiteladies Road, which was built in 1852 and is a Grade II listed building, with four radio studios. It was formally opened by the Lord Mayor of Bristol on 18 September 1934. The BBC has been on the same site ever since. 

It was made public in May 2021 that the BBC Studios production base, incorporating the Natural History Unit and Factual Entertainment, will be moving to a new site called Bridgewater House at Finzels Reach in Bristol city centre.

Main site 
Since first opening, Broadcasting House has grown to incorporate 25, 27/29, 31/33, (all also Grade II listed) and 33A&B Whiteladies Road, as well as nos 1, 3, 5, 7/9, 11/13, 15/17 and 19 Tyndall's Park Road. It now provides offices and technical facilities for the BBC Studios Natural History Unit, BBC Radio & Music Production Bristol, BBC West and BBC Radio Bristol.

Network radio studios, a network television studio (Studio B -Green Screen Virtual Studio), a regional television studio (Studio A), local radio studios, a combined television and radio newsroom, and an outside broadcast base have all been built on the site.

In 1986 33A&B Whiteladies Road were demolished to make way for a new development providing post-production facilities, a restaurant, library and headquarters offices for the South and West Region, as well as a new reception for Broadcasting House. The new building was opened by Chris Patten on 19 January 1990.

Other Bristol facilities 
At the time of World War II the BBC also had radio facilities at Redland Park Hall, All Saints Hall, the Chapter House, College Road, Clifton Parish Hall, the Cooperative Hall and the Clifton Rocks Railway.

In more recent times 15 Whiteladies Road, St Mary's Church in Belgrave Road, and Christchurch Hall have also provided accommodation and facilities. A radio control room was built in St George's Church, Brandon Hill.

From 1986, the BBC leased warehouses on the Kingsland Trading Estate, and also (from 2002) on the Lawrence Hill Industrial Park, to provide facilities for Casualty when it was produced in Bristol. However, the production moved to Cardiff in 2011.

References

External links 

BBC Bristol (Tour information) 

BBC offices, studios and buildings
Grade II listed buildings in Bristol
Mass media in Bristol